Jeferson Silva dos Santos, known as Jeferson Bahia or just Jeferson (born 28 May 1992) is a Brazilian football player who plays for Mes Rafsanjan F.C. .

Club career
He made his professional debut in the Segunda Liga for Varzim on 6 August 2016 in a game against Gil Vicente.

References

External links

1992 births
Sportspeople from Salvador, Bahia
Living people
Brazilian footballers
Association football defenders
Sertãozinho Futebol Clube players
Club Destroyers players
Desportiva Ferroviária players
Goytacaz Futebol Clube players
Varzim S.C. players
F.C. Penafiel players
Portimonense S.C. players
Londrina Esporte Clube players
Paraná Clube players
Amora F.C. players
Primeira Liga players
Liga Portugal 2 players
Campeonato Brasileiro Série C players
Campeonato Paranaense players
Brazilian expatriate footballers
Brazilian expatriate sportspeople in Bolivia
Expatriate footballers in Bolivia
Brazilian expatriate sportspeople in Portugal
Expatriate footballers in Portugal
Mes Rafsanjan players
Expatriate footballers in Iran
Brazilian expatriate sportspeople in Iran